John Murray (1712?–1775) was a British diplomat, notorious rake and friend of Giacomo Casanova.

From 1754 he was British resident in Venice.  He was appointed on 15 November 1765 as British Ambassador to the Ottoman Empire, arriving at Constantinople on 2 June 1766.  He was given leave to return home, leaving Turkey on 27 January 1775.  He sailed home on 25 May 1775 but died during a stop-over in Venice on 9 August 1775.

References

Bibliography 
 Alfred C. Wood, The History of the Levant Company

1710s births
1775 deaths
Ambassadors of Great Britain to the Ottoman Empire
18th-century British people
Ambassadors of Great Britain to the Republic of Venice